Atul Punj is an Indian businessman who is also chairman and managing director of Punj Lloyd.

Education
Punj graduated from Shri Ram College of Commerce, University of Delhi, in 1979 with a Bachelor's Degree in Commerce.

Award(s)
Ernst & Young Entrepreneur of the Year 2007 in the infrastructure and construction category.

References

Living people
1957 births
Businesspeople from Delhi
Businesspeople in construction